Le Chevalier Leonardo De (or de) Prunner  (died 1831) was an Italian soldier, a mineralogist and an entomologist. He wrote Catalogus larvarum Europae (1793, 39 pages) and Lepidoptera Pedemontana illustrata (1798, 127 pages).

Sources
Cesare Conci et Roberto Poggi (1996), Iconography of Italian Entomologists, with essential biographical data. Memorie della Società entomologica Italiana, 75 : 159–382.
Courte bibliographie en italien de Musei universitari

External links
Letter of 15 March 1810 to Thomas Jefferson Founders Archives. U.S. National Archives

Italian lepidopterists
18th-century births
1831 deaths